Reina Hispanoamericana 2021 was the 30th edition of the Reina Hispanoamericana pageant. It was held on October 30, 2021 in Santa Cruz, Bolivia. Regina Peredo of Mexico crowned Andrea Bazarte of Mexico as her successor at the end of the event. This marked Mexico’s first back-to-back victory in the pageant.

Results

Placements

 § – Facebook Vote Winner

Order of Announcements
Top 12

Top 7

Contestants

Crossovers 
Miss Earth
 2016:  Bruna Zanardo (Miss Earth Fire; Resigned)

Miss International
 2019  Alejandra Vengoechea (3rd runner-up)

Miss USA
 2016:  Theresa Agonia (as Rhode Island)

References 

Reina Hispanoamericana
2021 beauty pageants
Events in Santa Cruz de la Sierra